Premonition is the first live album released by John Fogerty as a solo artist.  He performs many hits by his earlier band, Creedence Clearwater Revival, as well as songs composed as a solo artist. It was recorded with a live audience at Warner Bros. Studios Stage 15 on December 12 & 13th, 1997, and is available on CD and DVD (with four additional tracks on the DVD).

History

After years of battling with Creedence Clearwater Revival, and feeling disgruntled about his publishing, Fogerty finally started to play the old Creedence songs again, something he stayed away from for many years. In 1987, Fogerty joined George Harrison, Bob Dylan and others onstage at a late night jam session at the Palomino Club.  During the performance, Bob asked John to play "Proud Mary".  Bob managed to get Fogerty to play the song, something Fogerty commented about on The Tonight Show sometime later.

Fogerty played a Vietnam tribute concert in 1987, and during that show, he played a few of the old Creedence songs for the first time as a solo artist.  During the entire Eye of the Zombie tour, Fogerty refused to play any of his older material.  In 1988, during the ceremony of the Rock and Roll Hall of Fame, John was asked to play "Long Tall Sally" but as Little Richard had gone, he proposed to play one of his own tunes, "Born on the Bayou".

CD track listing

All tracks written and composed by John Fogerty, except where noted.

 "Born on the Bayou" – 4:54
 "Green River" – 4:15
 "Susie Q" (Dale Hawkins, Stan Lewis, Eleanor Broadwater) – 5:24
 "I Put a Spell on You" (Screamin' Jay Hawkins) – 5:02
 "Who'll Stop the Rain" – 2:57
 "Premonition" – 3:18
 "Almost Saturday Night" – 2:26
 "Rockin' All Over the World" – 3:32
 "Joy of My Life" – 3:55
 "Down on the Corner" – 2:57
 "Centerfield" – 3:54
 "Swamp River Days" – 4:25
 "Hot Rod Heart" – 3:41
 "The Old Man Down the Road" – 4:23
 "Bad Moon Rising" – 2:18
 "Fortunate Son" – 4:11
 "Proud Mary" – 4:01
 "Travelin' Band" – 2:53

DVD track listing
 "Born on the Bayou"
 "Green River"
 "Susie Q"
 "I Put a Spell on You"
 "Bring It Down to Jelly Roll" (not on CD)
 "Who'll Stop the Rain"
 "Premonition"
 "110 in the Shade" (not on CD)
 "Almost Saturday Night"
 "Rockin' All Over the World"
 "Joy of My Life"
 "Down on the Corner"
 "Centerfield"
 "Swamp River Days"
 "Hot Rod Heart"
 "The Old Man Down the Road"
 "Blueboy" (not on CD)
 "Walking in a Hurricane" (not on CD)
 "Bad Moon Rising"
 "Fortunate Son"
 "Proud Mary"
 "Travelin' Band"

Personnel
 John Fogerty – guitar, vocals
 Johnny Lee Schell – guitar, backing vocals
 Michael Canipe – guitar, backing vocals
 Bob Glaub – bass
 Kenny Aronoff – drums
 Julia Waters, Maxine Waters and Oren Waters – backing vocals on "Premonition", "Almost Saturday Night" and "Down on the Corner"
 The Fairfield Four - backing vocals on "The Midnight Special" and "A Hundred and Ten in the Shade"

1998 Premonition Tour
Section source: Dutch

April 24: New Orleans Jazz and Heritage Festival
April 25: University of New Orleans.
June 12: Tinley Park, IL, New World Music Theatre
June 13: Deer Creek Music Center, Indianapolis, Indiana
June 15: Milwaukee WI, Marcus Amphitheatre
June 16: Minneapolis MN, Northrop Auditorium
June 18: Pine Knob Music Theater, Detroit
June 19: Burgettstown PA, Star Lake Amphitheatre
June 21: Darien Center, NY
June 22: Poughkeepsie, NY
June 24: Scraton, PA
June 25: Wantagh NY, Jones Beach Amph.
June 27: Holmdel NJ, P.N.C. Bank Arts Center
June 28: Wallingford CT, Oakdale Theatre
June 30: Mansfield MA, Great Woods Center
July 2: New York NY, Radio City Music Hall
July 3: Star Pavilion, Hershey, PA
July 5: Saratoga Springs NY, Performing Arts Center
July 7: Philadelphia PA, Mann Music Center
July 9: Virginia Beach VA, Virginia Beach Amphitheater
July 10: Bristow VA, Nissan Pavilion
July 19: Atlanta GA, Chastain Park Amphitheatre
July 21: Richmond VA, Classic Amphitheatre
July 22: Charlotte NC, Blockbuster Pavilion
July 25: West Palm Beach FL, Coral Sky Amphitheatre
July 29: Knoxville TN, World's Fair Park
July 31: Antioch TN, Starwood Amphitheatre
August 1: Little Rock AR
August 3: Woodlands TX, C.W. Mitchell Pavilion
August 4: Dallas TX, Starplex Amphitheatre
August 6: Morrison CO, Red Rocks Amphitheatre
August 8: Woodinville WA, Chateau Ste. Michelle
August 9: Eugene OR, Cuthbert Amphitheater
August 11: Portland OR, River Queen Showplace
August 13: Fresno CA
August 14: San Francisco CA, Bill Graham Civic Auditorium
August 15: San Jose CA
August 17: Chula Vista CA, Coors Amphitheatre
August 19: Los Angeles CA, Greek Theatre
August 20: Los Angeles CA, Greek Theatre
August 28: Boston
September 2: Copenhagen DEN Forum
September 4: Malmo SWE Baitiska Hallen
September 5: Goteborg SWE Scandinavium
September 7: Helsinki FIN Hartwall Arena
September 9: Norrkoping SWE Himmelstalundhallen
September 11: Stockholm SWE Stockholm Globe Arena
September 12: Borlange SWE Kupolen
September 14: Oslo NOR Oslo Spektrum
November 12: Sydney Entertainment Centre
November 15: Brisbane Entertainment Centre
November 18: Melbourne Park
November 19: Sandalford Estate, Perth
November 21: Adelaide Entertainment Centre

 Charts 

 Weekly charts 

 Year-end charts 

 Certifications 

 References 
 Album: Premonition'', John Fogerty, 1998, Reprise Records/Time Warner, Burbank, CA, cat.9-46908-2

External links
 John Fogerty official site
 Warner Bros. Records

John Fogerty albums
John Fogerty video albums
1998 video albums
Live video albums
1998 live albums
Warner Records live albums
Warner Records video albums
Albums produced by John Fogerty